Katangi is a City and a Municipal Council, near City of Balaghat in Balaghat District in the Indian state of Madhya Pradesh.

Geography
It has an average elevation of 442 metres (1,450 feet).

Transportation
Katangi has connectivity by road to cities like Nagpur, Seoni, Tumsar, Bhandara and the district headquarters of Balaghat.

Katangi also has railway connectivity. Katangi railway station is connected to Gondia via Balaghat by a broad-gauge network, Tirodi Railway Station is connected to Itwari (Nagpur) via Tumsar Road and Bhandara Road.

Transportation for goods are Sagar (Katangi to Gondia), KGN Transport (Nagpur to Katangi) and New India Travels (Nagpur to Katangi).

Demographics
 India census, Katangi had a population of 14,760. Males constitute 50% of the population and females 50%. Katangi has an average literacy rate of 71%, higher than the national average of 59.5%: male literacy is 78%, and female literacy is 64%. In Katangi, 13% of the population is under 6 years of age.

References

Cities and towns in Balaghat district

vi:Katangi